Lipa is a village in Rapla Parish, Rapla County in northwestern Estonia. Between 1991–2017 (until the administrative reform of Estonian municipalities) the village was located in Raikküla Parish.

Philosopher, translator, theologist and folklorist Uku Masing (1909–1985) was born in Einu (Eedu) farmstead in Lipa village.

Gallery

References

Villages in Rapla County